Brave Faces Everyone is the third studio album by American rock band Spanish Love Songs. It was released on February 7, 2020 under Pure Noise. The album was greeted with widespread acclaim by music critics, with a weighted score of 86 on review aggregator website  Metacritic.

On April 15, 2022, a reimagining of Brave Faces Everyone, titled Brave Faces, Etc., was released. It featured alternate and more electronic versions of the songs from Brave Faces Everyone.

Commercial performance
The album debuted at No. 21 on Vinyl Albums chart and No. 61 on the Top Album Sales chart with 2000 copies sold.

Critical reception

At Metacritic, which assigns a weighted average rating out of 100 to reviews from mainstream publications, this release received an average score of 86, based on 5 reviews.

Track listing

Notes 

 "Self-Destruction (As a Sensible Career Choice)" and "Optimism (As a Radical Life Choice)" are stylized in sentence case by the band, yet on all streaming platforms, the songs are listed in title case.
 "Beachfront Property" is sometimes stylized as "Beach Front Property."

Charts

References

2020 albums
Pure Noise Records albums